Jonathan Sesma González (born 14 November 1978) is a Spanish footballer who plays for CD Marino as a left winger. 

He amassed Segunda División totals of 196 matches and 45 goals during six seasons, in representation of Universidad Las Palmas, Córdoba and Cádiz. He added 119/19 in La Liga, with Cádiz and Valladolid.

Football career
Sesma was born in Las Palmas, Canary Islands. He played his early career in the third division – with the exception of the 2000–01 season in the second level, with Universidad de Las Palmas CF, suffering relegation – appearing for CD Corralejo and RCD Mallorca's B-team.

In the summer of 2001, Sesma joined Córdoba CF in division two, featuring very rarely over the course of two seasons and also being loaned to two clubs in the third tier, former side Universidad and AD Ceuta. Released in 2003, he moved to Cádiz CF with which he was an instant hit, scoring 23 goals in his first two years combined and achieving promotion to La Liga in his second.

Still with the Gaditanos, Sesma made his top flight debut on 28 August 2005 in a 1–2 home loss against Real Madrid. He continued to feature prominently, netting seven goals in 36 games but eventually being relegated at the end of the campaign, as second from the bottom.

On 14 August 2007, Sesma joined Real Valladolid, freshly returned to the top division. During his early spell, he too was an undisputed starter: on 22 November 2008, in a 3–0 away defeat of Villarreal CF, he scored a brace, with all three goals coming before half-time.

Sesma suffered from various physical problems during 2009–10, playing 1,700 minutes less than in the previous year and only scoring one goal. Also, the Castile and León team was relegated and his three-year contract was not renewed.

In early August 2010, at nearly 32, Sesma signed a one-year deal with former club Córdoba. The following season he had his first abroad experience, joining nine compatriots at Asteras Tripoli F.C. in Greece; he was released in the 2012 January transfer window, going on to compete in his country's lower leagues until his retirement.

References

External links

Stats and bio at Cadistas1910 

1978 births
Living people
Footballers from Las Palmas
Spanish footballers
Association football wingers
La Liga players
Segunda División players
Segunda División B players
Tercera División players
Universidad de Las Palmas CF footballers
RCD Mallorca B players
Córdoba CF players
AD Ceuta footballers
Cádiz CF players
Real Valladolid players
RSD Alcalá players
Orihuela CF players
SD Huesca footballers
CD Marino players
Super League Greece players
Asteras Tripolis F.C. players
Spanish expatriate footballers
Expatriate footballers in Greece
Spanish expatriate sportspeople in Greece